List of rivers of Georgia (U.S. state).

By drainage basin
This list is arranged by drainage basin, with respective tributaries indented under each larger stream's name.

Atlantic Ocean 

Savannah River
Abercorn Creek
Black Creek
Knoxboro Creek
Ebenezer Creek
Brier Creek
Little River
Hudson River
Tugaloo River
Chattooga River
Tallulah River
Coleman River
Toccoa Creek
Broad River
Bull River
Shad River
Halfmoon River
Wilmington River
Skidaway River
Herb River
Odingsell River

Ogeechee 
Little Ogeechee River (Chatham County)
Vernon River
Canoochee River
Williamson Swamp Creek
Rocky Comfort Creek
Little Ogeechee River (Hancock County)
Bear River
Medway River
Belfast River
Tivoli River
Laurel View River
Jerico River
North Newport River
South Newport River
Sapelo River
Broro River
Mud River
Crescent River
Duplin River
North River
South River
Darien River

Altamaha River
Ohoopee River
Little Ohoopee River
Ocmulgee River
Little Ocmulgee River
Alligator Creek
Gum Swamp Creek
Tobesofkee Creek
Swift Creek
Towaliga River
Alcovy River
South River
Walnut Creek
Yellow River
Oconee River
Little River
Apalachee River
Middle Oconee River
Mulberry River
North Oconee River
 Butler River
Hampton River
Frederica River
Mackay River
Brunswick River
Turtle River
Buffalo River
Little Satilla River

Satilla River
Little Satilla River
Big Satilla Creek
Little Satilla Creek
Alabaha River
Seventeen Mile River
Cumberland River
Crooked River
St. Marys River
North River

Gulf of Mexico 

Suwannee River
Withlacoochee River
Okapilco Creek
Little River
New River
Alapaha River
Alapahoochee River
Willacoochee River
Suwannoochee Creek
Okefenokee Swamp
Black River
Gum Swamp
Aucilla River
Ochlockonee River
Little Ochlockonee River

Apalachicola River (FL)
Chattahoochee River
Sawhatchee Creek
Pataula Creek
Hannahatchee Creek
Upatoi Creek
Bull Creek
Mulberry Creek
Mountain Oak Creek
Flat Shoal Creek
Yellowjacket Creek
Beech Creek
New River
Caney Creek
Dog River
Camp Creek
Sweetwater Creek
Noses Creek
Peachtree Creek
Nancy Creek
Sope Creek
Sewell Mill Creek
Willeo Creek
Vickery Creek (Big Creek tributary)
Hog Wallow Creek
Foe Killer Creek
Crooked Creek
Johns Creek (Chattahoochee River tributary)
Chestatee River
Tesnatee Creek
Soque River
Hazel Creek
Lick Log Creek
Law Creek
Little Hazel Creek
Deep Creek
Liberty Creek
Shoal Creek
Alley Creek
Flint River
Spring Creek
Ichawaynochaway Creek
Kinchafoonee Creek
Muckalee Creek

Mobile River (AL)
Alabama River (AL)
Coosa River
Chattooga River
Etowah River
Little River
Noonday Creek
Dykes Creek
Oostanaula River
Johns Creek (Oostanaula River tributary)
Alan Creek
Conasauga River
Jacks River
Coosawattee River
Cartecay River
Ellijay River
Tallapoosa River
Little Tallapoosa River

Mississippi River
Ohio River
Tennessee River (TN)
Hiwassee River
Toccoa River
Nottely River
Little Tennessee River

Miscellaneous 
River Styx - Georgia has two very small rivers named after the mythical Styx.  Both flow into swamps.  One is in the Savannah River watershed, the other is in the St. Marys River watershed.

Alphabetically

Alabaha River
Alan Creek
Alapaha River
Alapahoochee River
Alcovy River
Alley Creek
Allez River
Alligator Creek
Altamaha River
Apalachee River
Aucilla River
Ball Creek
Bear River
Beech Creek
Belfast River
Big Satilla Creek
Big Satilla River
 Black Creek (Ogeechee River tributary)
 Black Creek (Savannah River tributary)
Black River
Brier Creek
Broad River
Broro River
Brunswick River
Buffalo River
Bull Creek
Bull River
Camp Creek
Caney Creek
Canoochee River
Cartecay River
Chattahoochee River
Chattooga River, the northeast boundary with South Carolina
Chattooga River (Alabama-Georgia), in northwest Georgia
Chestatee River
Coleman River
Coleoatchee Creek
Conasauga River
Coosa River
Coosawattee River
Crescent River
Crooked Creek
Crooked River
Cumberland River
Darien River
Deep Creek
Dog River
Duplin River
Dykes Creek
Ebenezer Creek
Ellijay River
Etowah River
Flat Shoal Creek
Flint River
Foe Killer Creek
Frederica River
Gum Swamp Creek
Halfmoon River
Hampton River
Hannahatchee Creek
Hazel Creek
Herb River
Hiwassee River
Hog Wallow Creek
Hudson River (Georgia)
Ichawaynochaway Creek
Jacks River
Jerico River
Johns Creek (Chattahoochee River tributary)
Johns Creek (Oostanaula River tributary)
Kettle Creek
Kinchafoonee Creek
Knoxboro Creek
Laurel View River
Law Creek
Liberty Creek
Lick Log Creek
Little Hazel Creek
Little Ochlockonee River
Little Ocmulgee River
Little Ogeechee River (Chatham County)
Little Ogeechee River (Hancock County)
Little Ohoopee River
Little River (Columbia County, Georgia)
Little River (Etowah River tributary)
Little River (Oconee River tributary)
Little River (Withlacoochee River tributary)
Little Satilla Creek
Little Satilla River
Little Tallapoosa River
Little Tennessee River
Mackay River
Medway River
Middle Oconee River
Mountain Oak Creek
Muckalee Creek
Mud River
Mulberry Creek
Mulberry River
Nancy Creek
New River (Chattahoochee River tributary)
New River (Withlacoochee River tributary)
Noonday Creek
North Newport River
North Oconee River
North River (Darien River tributary)
North River (St. Marys River tributary)
Noses Creek
Nottely River
Ochlockonee River
Ocmulgee River
Oconee River
Odingsell River
Ogeechee River
Ohoopee River
Okapilco Creek
Oostanaula River
Pataula Creek
Peachtree Creek
River Styx
Rocky Comfort Creek
Runaway Negro Creek
St. Marys River
Sapelo River
Satilla River
Savannah River
Sawhatchee Creek
Sewell Mill Creek
Shad River
Shoal Creek
Sixteen Mile River
Skidaway River
Sope Creek
Soquee River
South Newport River
South River (Darien River tributary)
South River (Ocmulgee River tributary)
Spring Creek
Suwannee River
Suwannoochee Creek
Sweetwater Creek
Swift Creek
Tallapoosa River
Tallulah River
Tesnatee Creek
Tivoli River
Tobesofkee Creek
Toccoa River
Towaliga River
Tugaloo River
Turtle River
Upatoi Creek
Vernon River
Vickery Creek, or Big Creek
Willacoochee River
Willeo Creek
Williamson Swamp Creek
Wilmington River
Withlacoochee River
Yellow River
Yellowjacket Creek

References 
USGS Geographic Names Information System
USGS Hydrologic Unit Map - State of Georgia (1974)

See also
List of rivers in the United States

Georgia (U.S. state)
 
Rivers